The Ambara  church is located near village Myussera in the Gudauta District, Abkhazia/Georgia, on the cape of Miusera, close to the mouth of the Ambara stream. Ambara three-nave basilica represents an important example of this type's architectural monuments. Ambara church has been given the status of culture heritage monument.

History 
The Ambara church complex consists of a half-ruined three-nave basilica (first built in 7–8th century), a stone fence (Middle Ages) and remains of several additional secular structures, dated by scholars from the 8th to the 10th century. The basilica has a roughly processed ashlar stone surface stones that have survived almost in its original form, a two-storey narthex and an upper gallery on the west facade. The main nave vault bears traces of the Late Medieval reconstruction.

The Ambara church is one of the tourist destinations in Abkhazia. The area is reportedly increasingly being littered. Georgia has inscribed the church on its list of cultural heritage and treats it as part of cultural heritage in the Russian-occupied territories with no known current state of condition.

References 

Churches in Abkhazia
Immovable Cultural Monuments of National Significance of Georgia
Tourist attractions in Abkhazia